

Gavin Dennis Flood  (born 1954) is a British scholar of comparative religion  specialising in Shaivism and  phenomenology, but with research interests that span South Asian traditions.
From October 2005 through December 2015, he served in the Faculty of Theology University of Oxford and as the Academic Director of the Oxford Centre for Hindu Studies which is a Recognised Independent Centre of the University of Oxford. In 2008, Flood was granted the title of Professor of Hindu Studies and Comparative Religion from the University of Oxford. In 2014, he was elected a Fellow of the British Academy. In 2016, Flood became the inaugural Yap Kim Hao Professor of Comparative Religious Studies at Yale-NUS College in Singapore. He is a senior research fellow at Campion Hall, University of Oxford.

Published works

See also
 Oxford Centre for Hindu Studies

References and notes

External links
 Website 

1954 births
Academics of the Oxford Centre for Hindu Studies
Fellows of the British Academy
Hindu studies scholars
Living people
Yoga scholars